One Night Only is a British entertainment show, celebrating the best of British Music. Myleene Klass hosted the first episode in December 2008 with the singer Tom Jones. Ben Shephard hosted in 2009 and 2010, which saw Rod Stewart and Phil Collins take to the stage. In November 2010, Fearne Cotton hosted a one-off special with Bon Jovi and in 2011 presented by Christine Bleakley featuring music from Duran Duran. Another episode aired in November 2014, with Rob Brydon hosting Neil Diamond: One Night Only. Joanna Lumley presented the seventh episode with Bette Midler in December 2014. The 2008 Christmas special, which had Milton Jones, Will Smith and Cerys Matthews was directed by Geoff Posner and produced by David Tyler for Pozzitive Television.

Episodes

2009 British television series debuts
ITV (TV network) original programming